Thomson Medal may refer to:

 Thomson Medal Award from the International Mass Spectrometry Foundation
 Thomson Medal (Royal Society of New Zealand) from the Royal Society of New Zealand
 Institute of Physics Joseph Thomson Medal and Prize
 J. J. Thomson IET Achievement Medal